The 1979 Federation Cup was the 17th edition of the most important competition between national teams in women's tennis.  The tournament was held at the RSHE Club Campo in Madrid, Spain, from 30 April – 6 May.  The United States won their fourth consecutive title, defeating Australia in their ninth final.

Participating teams

Draw
All ties were played at the RSHE Club Campo in Madrid, Spain, on clay courts.

1st Round losing teams play in Consolation rounds

First round

South Korea vs. West Germany

Thailand vs. Italy

Indonesia vs. France

Switzerland vs. Denmark

Mexico vs. Romania

Chinese Taipei vs. Luxembourg

Portugal vs. Soviet Union

Great Britain vs. New Zealand

Ireland vs. Belgium

Czechoslovakia vs. Hungary

Sweden vs. Israel

Netherlands vs. Argentina

Japan vs. Norway

Spain vs. Yugoslavia

Canada vs. Australia

Second round

United States vs. West Germany

Italy vs. France

Switzerland vs. Romania

Luxembourg vs. Soviet Union

Great Britain vs. Belgium

Czechoslovakia vs. Sweden

Netherlands vs. Japan

Yugoslavia vs. Australia

Quarterfinals

United States vs. France

Switzerland vs. Soviet Union

Great Britain vs. Czechoslovakia

Netherlands vs. Australia

Semifinals

United States vs. Soviet Union

Czechoslovakia vs. Australia

Final

United States vs. Australia

Consolation rounds

Draw

First round

Mexico vs. Israel

Denmark vs. Indonesia

Hungary vs. Argentina

Spain vs. Norway

Thailand vs. Ireland

Chinese Taipei vs. Portugal

South Korea vs. New Zealand

Quarterfinals

Canada vs. Mexico

Denmark vs. Argentina

Spain vs. Thailand

Portugal vs. South Korea

Semifinals

Canada vs. Argentina

Spain vs. South Korea

Final

Argentina vs. Spain

References

Billie Jean King Cups by year
Federation
Fed
Fed
Fed
Federation Cup
Federation Cup, 1979
Federation Cup
Federation Cup